Brian Evan Mee (25 April 1930 – 29 May 2018) was an Australian rules footballer who played with St Kilda in the Victorian Football League (VFL).

Notes

External links 

1930 births
2018 deaths
Australian rules footballers from Victoria (Australia)
St Kilda Football Club players